Jo Bang-heon (Hangul: 조방헌; born February 16, 1953), better known by his stage name, Tae Jin-ah, is a South Korean trot singer and entertainer. He debuted in 1973 with the song, "My Heart Express Train," and rose to fame soon after with the song, "Memory of a Blue Hill." Since 2002, he has hosted a radio program on KBS Radio 2 called the Tae Jin Ah Show Show Show.  He often appears on the KBS 1TV 'Golden Oldies()'.

Personal life 
Tae has two sons.
 Eru (birth name Jo Sung-hyun), K-pop singer-songwriter
Jo Yoo-myeong, founder of YMC Entertainment and CEO of Swing Entertainment

Filmography

Film

Awards

Golden Disc Awards

Seoul Music Awards

Mnet Asian Music Awards

Ambassadorship 
 Daesong (DS) SLK Group Ambassador (2021)

References 

South Korean male singers
Trot singers
1953 births
Living people
South Korean male film actors
South Korean dance musicians
Grand Prize Seoul Music Award recipients